USS Baldwin (DD-624), was a United States Navy , in service from 1943 to 1946. She was the only ship of the U.S. Navy to be named for Charles H. Baldwin, an 1864 Medal of Honor recipient.

Baldwin was laid down on 19 July 1941 by Seattle-Tacoma Shipbuilding Co., Seattle, Washington and launched on 14 June 1942, sponsored by Mrs. Ida E. Crawford, daughter of Acting Master's Mate Baldwin. The ship was commissioned on 30 April 1943 and reported to the United States Atlantic Fleet.

Service history

1943
After shakedown training along the West Coast, the destroyer put to sea from San Francisco, California, on 1 July, bound for the East Coast. The flagship of Destroyer Division 36 (DesDiv 36), Baldwin led her division into Norfolk, Virginia, on 19 July and operated along the east coast until getting underway from New York on 13 August in the screen of a convoy bound for Casablanca, Morocco. Similar arrangements occupied her time until late January 1944, when she resumed duty along the Atlantic seaboard of the United States.

1944
The destroyer arrived at Plymouth, England, on 28 April and began a routine that combined patrols in British waters with preparations for the invasion of Normandy.

On 5 June, she departed the Isle of Portland in company with other units of the Western Naval Task Force. As a unit of the gunfire support group during the assault, Baldwin assisted the troops ashore with naval gunfire. In return, she suffered two hits from a light-caliber shore battery on D-Day, but sustained only slight damage. On 9 June, Baldwin joined  in repulsing an attack by German E-boats and received credit for destroying one of them. She operated off the coast of France until 15 July when she returned to England.

Three days later, the destroyer departed Plymouth in the screen of a 50-ship convoy bound for North Africa and arrived in Bizerte, Tunisia, on 28 July. She operated in the western Mediterranean mostly between Oran, Algeria, and Naples, Italy before arriving off Saint-Tropez on 15 August, D-Day for the invasion of southern France. Baldwin served there as an element of the Antisubmarine and Convoy Control Group, Task Group 80.6 (TG 80.6) which screened follow up convoys between Oran and southern France. On 23 September, she concluded her part in that operation and departed Oran in company with her division mates bound for the United States.

1945
Upon her arrival at New York on 3 October, the destroyer resumed operations in American coastal waters. On 21 January 1945, Baldwin put to sea from Norfolk to rendezvous with the cruiser  which carried President Franklin D. Roosevelt on the first leg of the trip to the "Big Three" conference at Yalta. She returned to New York on 27 February and began four months of operations in American waters.

On 24 June, the destroyer sailed from New York on her way to the Pacific. A month later, the warship joined Task Force 55 (TF 55) at Okinawa to prepare for the occupation of Sasebo, Japan, and participated in that operation between 20 September and 2 October. By 7 October, Baldwin was at Pusan, Korea, supporting forces sweeping mines along the Chinese and Korean coasts, a task at which she labored for the remainder of 1945.

1946-1961
The ship returned to the United States in January 1946 and operated along the east coast through the spring of that year. She was placed out of commission at Charleston, South Carolina, on 20 June 1946 and remained in reserve there until January 1961 when she was transferred to Atlantic Reserve Fleet, Boston.

Baldwin was considered not worth repairing. Her name was struck from the Navy List on 1 June 1961, and she was scuttled on 6 June 1961, not far from where she went aground.

Awards
Baldwin earned three battle stars for her World War II service.

References

External links

 
history.navy.mil: USS Baldwin photos 
navsource.org: USS Baldwin
hazegray.org: USS Baldwin

World War II destroyers of the United States
Ships built in Seattle
1942 ships
Gleaves-class destroyers of the United States Navy
Maritime incidents in 1961
Scuttled vessels
Shipwrecks of the New York (state) coast